Campanula pendula is a species of flowering plant in the family Campanulaceae. It is native to the North Caucasus of Russia. It is a herbaceous perennial plant growing to 30–60 cm tall. The leaves are cordate to lanceolate in shape with biserrated edges. The flowers are nodding, bell-shaped, 3–5 cm long, creamy white, produced in arching panicles from early summer to early autumn.

References

pendula
Flora of Russia